Black Wednesday was a British financial crisis on 16 September 1992.

Black Wednesday may also refer to:
 Other one-time events:
 Black Wednesday 1878, a political crisis in Victoria, Australia
 Black Wednesday (air travel), a 1954 crisis in air-traffic control
 Black Wednesday (comic), a 1959 Disney comic by Carl Barks
 Black Wednesday, a day of despair in the 1967 Chicago White Sox season
 Black Wednesday, a day in 1981 when Michael Scott fired forty employees at Apple Computer
 Black Wednesday, Wednesday 26th March 1986, the day when Swindon Works closed after 143 years of operation. 
 Black Wednesday, a day of mass sexual assault in Egypt in 2005
 The first Wednesday of the 2013 Wimbledon Championships
 Black Wednesday in United Kingdom health care, first Wednesday in August, parallel to U.S. "July effect"

See also
 Bloody Wednesday (disambiguation)

he:יום רביעי השחור